Odontoglossum blandum, the charming odontoglossum, is a species of orchid found from Ecuador to Peru.

blandum